The Mowag 4x4  armored dummy is a target practice vehicle used by the armed forces of Switzerland.

History 

Originally designed as an armored reconnaissance vehicle, the armored dummy tank is based on a Mowag T1 4x4 GW 3500 chassis. It was used as a moving target for the armor Wurfgranate (exercise) as well as for practice with shells of rocket tube (20mm insert operation), the SIG SG 510 assault rifle and practice with hand grenades. 240 units were built and used by the Swiss army from 1954 to 1987.

The vehicle with the number M+83124 is now located at the Schweizerisches Militärmuseum Full.

See also
 Zielfahrzeug 68 tracked target tank

Target practice
Military dummy

References 

Military trucks
Off-road vehicles
Wheeled military vehicles
Military education and training
Targeting (warfare)
Armoured fighting vehicles of the post–Cold War period
Military vehicles of Switzerland